Mr. Fahrenheit may refer to:
 A song lyric from "Don't Stop Me Now" by Queen
Mr. Fahrenheit (pageant), gay beauty pageant in Philippines
Mr. Fahrenheit, 2016 young adult novel by T. Michael Martin

See also
 Fahrenheit (disambiguation)